The 1922 United States Senate elections in Arizona took place on November 7, 1922. Incumbent Democratic U.S. Senator Henry F. Ashurst ran for reelection to a third term, defeating Republican nominee James Harvey McClintock in the general election by a wide margin.

Primary elections
Primary elections were held on September 12, 1922.

Democratic primary

Candidate
Henry F. Ashurst, incumbent U.S. Senator

Results

Republican primary

Candidates
James P. Boyle

Results

Boyle resigned. The Republican State Central Committee selected James Harvey McClintock, State Historian to fill the vacancy.

General election

See also 
 1922 United States Senate elections

Biography

References

1922
Arizona
United States Senate